Atanas Tasholov (born 9 September 1998) is a Bulgarian footballer who currently plays as a defender.

Career
On 9 December 2016, Tasholov made his professional debut for Botev Plovdiv in a 0–4 away defeat by Neftochimic, coming on as substitute for Yaya Meledje.  On 16 June 2017, he signed his first professional contract and was sent on loan to Maritsa Plovdiv.  In June 2018, he was loaned to Nesebar.

References

External links

Living people
1998 births
Bulgarian footballers
Bulgaria youth international footballers
Association football defenders
Botev Plovdiv players
FC Maritsa Plovdiv players
PFC Nesebar players
Neftochimic Burgas players
FC Lokomotiv Gorna Oryahovitsa players
FC Krumovgrad players
First Professional Football League (Bulgaria) players
Second Professional Football League (Bulgaria) players
Footballers from Plovdiv